Cruach Mhór (Irish for "big stack"), at  high, is the tenth-highest peak in Ireland on the Arderin list, and the eleventh-highest peak in Ireland according to the Vandeleur-Lynam list. A distinctive square grotto marks the summit.  It is part of the MacGillycuddy's Reeks in County Kerry.

Geography 
Cruach Mhór is at the far eastern section of MacGillycuddy's Reeks in County Kerry, Ireland's highest mountain range.  It is the first major peak in the MacGillycuddy's Reeks Ridge Walk when started from Kate Kearney's Cottage in the Gap of Dunloe.  The ridge between Cruach Mhór and Cnoc na Péiste , is marked by The Big Gun  at its centre, and is considered as offering some of the most exposed and serious hill walking in Ireland (equivalent to The Bones on the nearby Beenkeragh Ridge). The Macgillycuddy's Reeks Ridge Walk continues along this ridge to Maolán Buí  and on to Carrauntoohil, Ireland's highest mountain.  

Just over 3 km to the east-northeast of Cruach Mhór, across a sharp notch, is the lesser peak of Cnoc an Bhráca . There is a lower peak to the east of Cruach Mhór known as Cruach Bheag ("little stack").

On the summit of Cruach Mhór is a stone grotto built by a local farmer who hauled up the cement on his back, and its small statue is changed every year.  The square structure, which sits on the exact summit, is visible from a distance.

Cruach Mhór is the 401st-highest mountain in Britain and Ireland on the Simm classification. It is listed by the Scottish Mountaineering Club ("SMC") as one of 34 Furths, which is a mountain above  in elevation, and meets the other SMC criteria for a Munro (e.g. "sufficient separation"), but which is outside of (or furth) Scotland; which is why Cruach Mhór is sometimes referred to as one of the 13 Irish Munros.  

Cruach Mhór's prominence qualifies it to meet the Arderin classification, and the British Isles Simm and Hewitt classifications.

See also 

 Lists of mountains in Ireland
 List of mountains of the British Isles by height
 List of Furth mountains in the British Isles

References

External links
MountainViews: The Irish Mountain Website
MountainViews: Irish Online Mountain Database
The Database of British and Irish Hills , the largest database of British Isles mountains ("DoBIH")
Hill Bagging UK & Ireland, the searchable interface for the DoBIH
Ordnance Survey Ireland ("OSI") Online Map Viewer
Logainm: Placenames Database of Ireland

Mountains and hills of County Kerry
Furths
Mountains under 1000 metres